Hameed Akhtar (12 March 1923 – 17 October 2011), was a newspaper columnist, writer, journalist and the secretary-general of the Progressive Writers Association in Pakistan. He was also the father of TV actress Saba Hameed.

Early life
Hameed Akhtar finished his basic education in Ludhiana area and was a childhood friend of the now renowned poets Sahir Ludhianvi and Ibn-e-Insha in his school years.
Later, his family migrated to Pakistan. His birth name was Akhtar Ali which he changed to Hameed Akhtar in high school.

Career
After the independence of Pakistan in 1947, he joined the daily Urdu language newspaper Daily Imroze in 1948 in Lahore and then later became its editor. In 1970, he co-founded the daily Urdu language newspaper 'Azad' with fellow journalists Abdullah Malik and I. A. Rehman. Hameed Akhtar was a well-respected newspaper columnist and wrote columns for many newspapers in his lifetime, most recently for Daily Express newspaper. Writer Intezar Hussain described Hameed Akhtar as a chronicler of the Progressive Writers Movement who worked relentlessly for progressive causes such as achieving equality among humans, and his lifetime contributions are of great value. He also said, after Hameed Akhtar's death, that he wanted to pass on his bitter and sweet memories of the tough times he had to the next generation through his pen. Over his lifetime, to name a few, Hameed Akhtar had interacted with writers like Faiz Ahmad Faiz, Munnu Bhai, Hafeez Jalandhri, Ismat Chughtai, Patras Bokhari, Saadat Hasan Manto, Kaifi Azmi, Krishan Chander and Jan Nisar Akhtar.

Awards and recognition
 Pride of Performance Award in 2010 by the President of Pakistan

Books and film scriptwriter
 Aashnaayian Kia Kia
 Kaal Kothri – this book was a memento of his time in jail
 Royedad-e-Anjuman
 Sukh Ka Sapna (film script written for this 1962 film)
 Paraaye Aag (film script written in 1971)

Death and legacy
He died on 17 October 2011 in Lahore, Pakistan after a long battle with cancer at age 88. Hameed Akhtar's survivors are his wife, 3 daughters and 1 son including his TV actress daughter Saba Hameed. Saba Hameed first married Syed Pervaiz Shafi. They were later separated and divorced. They had a daughter, actress Meesha Shafi and a son, music performer Faris Shafi. She later married TV actor Waseem Abbas, with whom she had a son named Ali Abbas, also an actor.

After his death, veteran Pakistani journalist and human rights activist I. A. Rehman called him an enlightened person who was an excellent journalist, a good short story writer and a filmmaker.

References 

1924 births
2011 deaths
Progressivism in Pakistan
Pakistani columnists
Pakistani male journalists
Punjabi people
Recipients of the Pride of Performance